Teeko is an abstract strategy game invented by John Scarne in 1937 and rereleased in refined form in 1952 and again in the 1960s. Teeko was marketed by Scarne's company, John Scarne Games Inc.; its quirky name, he said, borrowed letters from Tic-tac-toe, Chess, Checkers, and Bingo.

Gameplay
The Teeko board consists of twenty-five spaces arranged in a five-by-five grid. There are eight markers in a Teeko game, four black and four red. One player, "Black" plays the black markers, and the other, "Red", plays the red. Black moves first and places one marker on any space on the board. Red then places a marker on any unoccupied space; black does the same; and so on until all eight markers are on the board. The object of the game is for either player to win by having all four of his markers in a straight line (vertical, horizontal, or diagonal) or on a square of four adjacent spaces. (Adjacency is horizontal, vertical, or diagonal, but does not wrap around the edges of the board.) If neither player has won after the "drop" (when all eight pieces are on the board), then they move their pieces one at a time, with Black playing first. A piece may be moved only to an adjacent space.

The rules, as summarized above, are very simple, but the strategy is complicated enough to fill a book, Scarne on Teeko, by Scarne (1955). Nonetheless, Guy L. Steele Jr. solved the game (i.e., showed what must occur if both players play perfectly) via computer in 1998: he found that neither player can force a win.

Variations
There are sixteen variations of Teeko, such as Advanced Teeko, which have slightly different rules. All sixteen are outlined in Scarne on Teeko; the rules above are for "Standard Teeko" (or "Teeko"). Steele showed that Advanced Teeko is a win for Black (assuming, again, that both players play perfectly), as is one other variation, but the other fourteen are draws.

See also
Connect Four
Connect6

References

External links
Browser-based version of the game

Board games introduced in 1937
Abstract strategy games
Solved games